Garmisch-Partenkirchen Olympics
1936 Winter Olympics IV Olympic Winter Games
1940 Winter Olympics V Olympic Winter Games (suspended for World War II)